Pisal Banda is a locality in Santoshnagar neighbourhood of Hyderabad, Telangana, India. It is well known for being the site of the historic Paigah Tombs and Phisal Banda Palace of Nawab Zafar Jung Bahadur of Khursheed Jahi Paigah , a rich Nobleman and an amateur astronomer in Hyderabad in 1901 when he bought a 6 inch telescope from England. He installed it in his Pisal Banda Palace premises in a Seven storey Almirah type building, Hyderabad. He requested that it be called Nizamiah Observatory after the sixth Nizam of Hyderabad, Mir Mahboob Ali Khan. Nawab Zafar Jung Bahadur died in 1907 and as per his request the Nizam's Government take over the Observatory. In accordance with his wishes, the administration of the Observatory was taken over by the Finance Department of the Nizam's Government in 1908.[2][3] ( now Deccan Medical College and Owaisi Hospital are situated at the very same place )

Commercial area
There are many shops catering to all budgets. There is a big vegetable market at Madannapet, which is quite popular among people of surrounding suburbs.

Transport
TSRTC connects Pisal Banda with all parts of the city. The buses in service are 93, 94, 97D, 98, 102, etc. The closest MMTS Train station is at Yakutpura.

References 

Neighbourhoods in Hyderabad, India